Emory Marvin Underwood (December 11, 1877 – August 28, 1960) was a United States district judge of the United States District Court for the Northern District of Georgia.

Education and career

Born in Douglas County, Georgia, Underwood received a Bachelor of Arts degree from Vanderbilt University in 1900 and a Bachelor of Laws from Vanderbilt University Law School in 1902. He was in private practice in Atlanta, Georgia from 1903 to 1914, an Assistant Attorney General of the United States from 1914 to 1917, general counsel for the Seaboard Air Line Railroad from 1917 to 1919,  and general solicitor for the United States Railroad Administration from 1919 to 1920. He returned to private practice in Atlanta from 1920 to 1931.

Federal judicial service

On February 7, 1931, Underwood was nominated by President Herbert Hoover to a seat on the United States District Court for the Northern District of Georgia vacated by Judge Samuel Hale Sibley. Underwood was confirmed by the United States Senate on February 25, 1931, and received his commission on March 2, 1931. He assumed senior status on March 5, 1948. Underwood served in that capacity until his death August 28, 1960.

References

Sources
 

1877 births
1960 deaths
Judges of the United States District Court for the Northern District of Georgia
United States district court judges appointed by Herbert Hoover
20th-century American judges
People from Douglas County, Georgia
Vanderbilt University alumni
Vanderbilt University Law School alumni